José Osorio y Silva, 9th Duke of Sesto, 16th Duke of Alburquerque, 17th Marquess of Alcañices (4 April 1825 – 30 December 1909), was a Spanish nobleman, politician and army officer. He was also known by one of his titles, Duke of Sesto, inherited from his father, and by nicknames Pepe Osorio or Pepe Alcañices. He was head and representative of the houses of Alcañices, Alburquerque and los Balbases, causing a personal union of sixteen noble titles and four grandee titles. He is also considered one of the most notable mayors of Madrid, serving from 1857 to 1864.

He had inherited strong monarchist convictions as a result of his education and family tradition. During the Glorious Revolution he convinced Isabel II that the only way to re-establish the monarchy was for her to abdicate - he was the first to sign the abdication document and became so involved in the process that the queen told her son "Alfonso, shake hands with Pepe, who has managed to make you king". During the royal family's exile he paid their expenses and put his residence in Deauville at their disposal.

He then paved the way for the restoration of the monarchy and the accession of Isabel's son Alfonso XII, on which he spent much of his family fortune. Alfonso XII came to look on him as a second father and throughout Alfonso's life José was his best friend and main advisor. He also acted as mentor to prince Alfonso (the future Alfonso XIII) and José's wife, the Russian princess Sofía Troubetzkoya, built up support for the restoration socially among the Spanish nobility while José's friend Antonio Cánovas del Castillo consolidated support politically.

On Alfonso XII's death in 1885, José was disgraced before his widow Maria Christina of Austria and left the Spanish court. He spent his last years back in politics as well as on business and leisure travel across Europe with his wife. He died aged 84 in his palace of Paseo de Recoletos on the thirty-fifth anniversary of the start of the restoration of the monarchy. He left no children and named his nephew Miguel Osorio y Martos as his heir.

Life

Childhood
He was born in Madrid, in the palace of Alcañices, on 4 April 1821, the son of Nicolás Osorio y Zayas (1793-1866), marquis of Alcañices and of los Balbases, Duke of Alburquerque, the owner of 18 titles of nobility and 6 grandeeships of Spain. The marquis held several offices of the Spanish Crown, such as High Steward to king consort Francisco de Asís de Borbón, Steward and Great Equerry to Infanta Isabel, Princess of Asturias, Gentleman of the Bedchamber Grandee of Spain to queen Isabel II of Spain and tutor to prince Alfonso, later Alfonso XII of Spain.

His mother was Inés de Silva y Téllez-Girón (1806-1865), daughter of José Gabriel de Silva-Bazán, 10th marquis of Santa Cruz de Mudela, grandee of Spain and of Joaquina Téllez-Girón y Pimentel, Countess of Osilo. He had six siblings of whom only Joaquín survived to adulthood. José had a close relationship with his brother Joaquín throughout his life and ceded the title of count of la Corzana to him and his descendants on marrying María de las Mercedes de Heredia y Zafra-Vázquez, 3rd marquise of los Arenales.

From a young age he was tutored by some of the most prestigious teachers of the time, learning to speak English, French and Italian. In 1834 he attended the Masarnau school in Madrid, an institution linked to the University of Madrid. The family would spend their summers in Cuéllar (Segovia), at the castle owned by the family and which had been used for this purpose since the Dukes of Alburquerque went to live near the Royal Court. They would also often visit Ledesma (Salamanca) during the holidays. During his childhood he was a frequent visitor of the Royal Palace of Madrid together with his mother, who was a close friend of queen María Cristina and, after the death of the king and subsequent start of the First Carlist War, the family went into exile in Italy, settling in turn in Rome, Naples and Palermo.

Equestrian pursuits

Mayor of Madrid

Education of the prince and exile

Involvement in the Restoration

Re-establishment of the monarchy

Final years at court

Old age

Illness and death

Heraldry

References

External links
Biografiasyvidas.com

Spanish military personnel
Spanish nobility
Civil governors of Madrid
Knights of the Golden Fleece of Spain